VA-5 has the following meanings:
Attack Squadron 5 (U.S. Navy)
State Route 5 (Virginia)
Virginia's 5th congressional district